Wu Shuqing may refer to:

 Wu Shuqing (revolutionary) (吳淑卿; 1892–?), Chinese revolutionary
 Wu Shuqing (economist) (吴树青; 1932–2020), Chinese economist
 Annie Wu (businesswoman) (伍淑清; born 1948), Hong Kong businesswoman